The 2006 IIHF World Championship rosters consisted of 370 players on 16 national ice hockey teams. Run by the International Ice Hockey Federation (IIHF), the Ice Hockey World Championships is the sport's highest-profile annual international tournament. The 2006 IIHF World Championship was the 70th edition of the tournament and was held in Riga, Latvia. Sweden won the Championship, the eighth time they had done so.

Before the start of the World Championship, each participating nation had to submit a list of players for its roster. A minimum of fifteen skaters and two goaltenders, and a maximum of twenty skaters and three goaltenders had to be selected. If a country selects fewer than the maximum allowed, they must choose the remaining players prior to the start of the tournament. After the start of the tournament, each team was allowed to select an additional two players, either skaters or goaltenders, to their roster, for a maximum roster of 25 players. Once players were registered to the team, they could not be removed from the roster.

To qualify for a national team under IIHF rules, a player must follow several criteria. He must be a citizen of the nation, and be under the jurisdiction of that national association. Players are allowed to switch which national team they play for, providing they fulfill the IIHF criteria. If participating for the first time in an IIHF event, the player would have had to play two consecutive years in the national competition of the new country without playing in another country. If the player has already played for a national team before, he may switch countries if he is a citizen of the new country, and has played for four consecutive years in the national competition of the new country. This switch may only happen once in the player's life.

Niklas Kronwall of Sweden was named the tournament's most valuable player and best defenceman by the IIHF directorate. Sidney Crosby of Canada led the tournament in goals and total point scoring, and was named the top forward. Swede Johan Holmqvist was selected as top goaltender. Finland's Fredrik Norrena led goaltenders in save percentage, with 0.951.



Legend

Belarus

Head coach:

Skaters

Goaltenders

Canada

Head coach:

Skaters

Goaltenders

Czech Republic

Head coach:

Skaters

Goaltenders

Denmark
Head coach:

Skaters

Goaltenders

Finland

Head coach:

Skaters

Goaltenders

Italy
Head coach:

Skaters

Goaltenders

Kazakhstan
Head coach:

Skaters

Goaltenders

Latvia
Head coach:

Skaters

Goaltenders

Norway
Head coach:

Skaters

Goaltenders

Russia
Head coach:

Skaters

Goaltenders

Slovakia
Head coach:

Skaters

Goaltenders

Slovenia
Head coach:

Skaters

Goaltenders

Sweden
Head coach:

Skaters

Goaltenders

Switzerland
Head coach:

Skaters

Goaltenders

Ukraine
Head coach:

Skaters

Goaltenders

United States
Head coach:

Skaters

Goaltenders

References

Team rosters
Belarus
Canada
Czech Republic
Denmark
Finland
Italy
Kazakhstan
Latvia
Norway
Russia
Slovakia
Slovenia
Sweden
Switzerland
Ukraine
United States

Player statistics
Belarus
Canada
Czech Republic
Denmark
Finland
Italy
Kazakhstan
Latvia
Norway
Russia
Slovakia
Slovenia
Sweden
Switzerland
Ukraine
United States

rosters
IIHF World Championship rosters